White noise is primarily a signal or sound with a flat frequency spectrum.

White Noise may also refer to:

Literature
 White Noise (novel), a 1985 novel by Don DeLillo
 White Noise (play), a 2019 play by Suzan-Lori Parks

Film and television 
 White Noise (2005 film), a horror thriller film starring Michael Keaton
 White Noise: The Light, the sequel
 White Noise, a 2004 film starring Rahul Bose
 White Noise (2020 film), a documentary film
 White Noise (2022 film), a black comedy film directed by Noah Baumbach based on the DeLillo book
 White Noise, a fictional character from The Venture Bros. episode "Powerless in the Face of Death"

Music 
 White Noise (band), an English electronic music band
 White Noise Records, an American record label
 The White Noise, an American post-hardcore music group
 White Noise: A Cautionary Musical, a rock musical, based on the real-life band Prussian Blue
 White Noise, a Scottish rock band formed by Doogie White

Albums
 White Noise (Cop Shoot Cop album), 1991
 White Noise (Gary Numan album), 2008 
 White Noise (PVRIS album), or the title song, 2014
 White Noise (The Living End album), 2008
 Sound of White Noise, a 1993 album by Anthrax
 White Noise, a 2002 album by Alpinestars
 White Noise, a 2017 album by Noah Gundersen
 White Noise, a 2007 EP by David Sneddon

Songs
 "White Noise" (Disclosure song), 2013
 "White Noise" (Linkin Park song), 2014
 "White Noise" (The Living End song), 2008
 "White Noise (백색소음)", by Exo from Ex'Act, 2016
 "White Noise", by Antarctigo Vespucci from Love in the Time of E-Mail, 2018
 "White Noise", by Erra from Impulse, 2011
 "White Noise", by FEMM from Femm-Isation, 2014
 "White Noise", by Lorna Shore from Psalms, 2015
 "White Noise", by Mogwai from Hardcore Will Never Die, but You Will, 2011
 "White Noise", by Steven Page from Discipline: Heal Thyself, Pt. II, 2018

Other uses
 White noise machine, privacy and sleep aid that makes use of white noise or similar masking signals
 White Noise, name of the supporters group of the New Zealand national football team, All Whites